The 2010–11 Hércules CF season is the club's 88th in existence and his first season after 13 years without playing in the top flight of Spanish football, La Liga. In the existing Hércules season returns to Primera trained by Esteban and paying transfers by Nelson Valdez (€4M), Abel Aguilar (€1.5M) or Piet Velthuizen (€0.8M), all cornered by signing star David Trezeguet and transfer of Royston Drenthe.

Team kit

The team kits for the 2010–11 season are produced by Nike, first in its history. For the first time since 1983, the Hércules will not have sponsor on their shirts. Only in a friendly match against Real Madrid, the Hércules wore the sponsor Cívica. On 29 July 2010, the new shirts were officially presented. The first kit, maintains its traditional colors of blue and white vertical stripes with historic characterized by its thickness. The black color of his pants is the same as in its 88-year history. The socks are blue with some white details. New for this season, is the second kit, which for the first time in his life, will have horizontal stripes on his shirt. Pants and socks are still black for the second kit. The socks and pants will be white, so that these items are not confused with those of a rival team.

Players

Squad information

Total squad cost: €7,610,000

From youth system 
As of 1 September.

Players in / out

In 

Total spending:  €7,010,000

Out 

Total income:   €0.

Reserves and Academy

Club

Coaching staff

Health and Medical staff

Auxiliary staff

Executive and Administrative staff

Statistics

Appearances and goals

Last updated on 1 September 2010.
(Substitute appearances without playing, in brackets)

Key
# = Squad number
P = Playing position
N = Nation
GS = Game started
Liga = Number of games played in Liga
G = Number of goals scored
Cup = Number of games played in Copa del Rey

Start formations

Captains
Last updated on 12 September 2010.

Goalscorers 
Includes all competitive matches. The list is sorted by shirt number when total goals are equal.
Last updated on 12 September

Disciplinary record 

Last updated on 12 September 2010.	

Notes:
Fritzler in Round 1 was sent off for two yellow cards, but the competition committee annulled the second caution, as computed only a yellow.

Competitions

Overall
Hércules is going to be present in two national competitions: La Liga and the Copa del Rey.

La Liga

League table

Results summary

Results by round

Competitive

La Liga

Copa del Rey

Round of 32

Málaga won 3–2 on aggregate.

Pre-season

References

External links
Hércules CF  – official site

Spanish football clubs 2010–11 season
2010-11